Jens Knippschild (born 15 February 1975) is a former tennis player from Germany, who turned professional in 1992. In his career, he won two doubles titles (2001, Båstad and 2002, Bucharest). The right-hander reached his highest singles ranking by the ATP on 9 August 1999, when he became the No. 76 of the world.

ATP career finals

Singles: 1 (1 runner-up)

Doubles: 3 (2 titles, 1 runner-up)

ATP Challenger and ITF Futures finals

Singles: 10 (5–5)

Doubles: 20 (15–5)

Performance timelines

Singles

Doubles

External links
 
 
 

1975 births
Living people
People from Bad Arolsen
Sportspeople from Kassel (region)
German male tennis players
Tennis people from Hesse